The United States Association of Collegiate Fencing Clubs (USACFC) was established in 2003 to educate and promote collegiate fencing throughout the United States. The organization has over 45 teams, about one-third of the schools with non-varsity college club fencing in the U.S.

USACFC became a nonprofit corporation in 2005.

Champions

Sites of USACFC National Championships 
2003: University of Florida 
2004: University of New Hampshire 
2005: Michigan State University
2006: Clemson University
2007: Indiana University 
2008: Smith College
2009: University of Wisconsin
2010: Swarthmore College
2011: University of Chicago
2012: Hartford, Connecticut, originally slated for United States Military Academy
2013: Michigan State University
2014: University of Tennessee
2015: Bensalem, Pennsylvania, hosted by Swarthmore College
2016: Brown University
2017: East Lansing, Michigan, hosted by Michigan State University
2018: Knoxville, Tennessee, hosted by University of Tennessee Knoxville
2019: Bucks County, Pennsylvania
2020: Cancelled due to COVID-19, originally slated for West Springfield, Massachusetts
2021: Cancelled due to COVID-19, originally slated for West Springfield, Massachusetts
2022: Providence, Rhode Island

See also
National Intercollegiate Women's Fencing Association (NIWFA)
Intercollegiate Fencing Association (IFA)

References

External links 
USACFC website

Fencing organizations
College fencing in the United States